Eta Horologii (η Horologii, η Hor) is a binary star system in the southern constellation of Horologium. It is visible to the naked eye with a combined apparent visual magnitude of 5.31. Based upon an annual parallax shift of 21.95 mas as seen from Earth, it is located around 149 light years from the Sun.

The orbit for this pair is not yet well constrained. They appear to have an orbital period of three years and an eccentricity of roughly 0.16. As of 2012, the pair have an angular separation of 78.7 mas, which corresponds to a projected separation of 3.6 AU. The primary member, component A, is an A-type main sequence star with a stellar classification of A6 V. The secondary, component B, has an inferred class of  F0 V, which would indicate it is an F-type main sequence star.

References

A-type main-sequence stars
Astrometric binaries
Horologium (constellation)
Horologii, Eta
Durchmusterung objects
016555
012225
0778